Ilija Ivić (born 16 July 1991) is a Croatian footballer currently playing for FC Widnau.

Club career
As a St. Gallen player, he was out for several months after a cruciate ligament rupture in 2013. On his return, he was loaned to Schaffhausen in summer 2014 and to  Chiasso in 2015.

Ahead of the 2019/20 season, Ivić returned to his former youth club FC Widnau.

References

External links
 

1991 births
Living people
People from Altstätten
Association football central defenders
Croatian footballers
FC St. Gallen players
FC Schaffhausen players
FC Chiasso players
SC Brühl players
Swiss Super League players
Swiss Promotion League players
Swiss Challenge League players